The Andaman spiny shrew or Andaman shrew (Crocidura hispida) is a species of mammal in the family Soricidae. It is endemic to India. Its natural habitat is subtropical or tropical dry forests.

Sources
 Insectivore Specialist Group & CBSG CAMP India Workshop 2000. Crocidura hispida. 2006 IUCN Red List of Threatened Species. Downloaded on 30 July 2007.

hispida
Mammals of India
Mammals described in 1913
Taxa named by Oldfield Thomas
Taxonomy articles created by Polbot